"Don't Ask Me" is the only single by Heli Simpson. The single is the latest of The Saddle Club cast member to release a single. The single had fared quite well in Australia. After "Don't Ask Me" came out Heli's only album Princess Veronica came out in 2004. Heli Simpson's only EP is "Princess Veronica Tour EP" which was also released in 2004.

Track listings
CD single
 "Don't Ask Me"
 "Money Can't Buy"
 "Princess Veronica"
 Album Medley ("The Way You Are", "Crazy", "Holding Onto You", "I Want You To Know", "A Girl Like Me", "All I Want", "No One Like You")

Charts
The single debuted and peaked at #16 on the ARIA Singles chart, before taking a plunge to #28 the following week. It then fell to #40, before making a 13 spot rise to #27, then #35 then exiting the top 50 for the last time.

Release history

References

2004 debut singles
Heli Simpson songs
Shock Records singles
2004 songs